Real Life is the debut studio album by English rock band Magazine. It was released in June 1978 by record label Virgin. The album includes the band's debut single "Shot by Both Sides", and was also preceded by the non-album single "Touch and Go", a song from the album's recording sessions.

Real Life has received critical acclaim and is considered a pioneering post-punk record. It has also been described as new wave and art rock.

Background and recording 
The album was written over the preceding year by the band, with Howard Devoto providing all of the lyrics. The two earliest songs, "Shot by Both Sides" and "The Light Pours Out of Me", were co-written with Devoto's former Buzzcocks bandmate Pete Shelley. The majority of the material on the album was written by Devoto in collaboration with guitarist and founding member John McGeoch. "Motorcade" was co-written with the group's keyboardist, the classically trained composer, Bob Dickinson, who played with the group in mid-1977 before being dismissed without warning at a meeting convened by Devoto in November of that year. Dickinson has cited the influence of Satie on elements of the keyboard part in this song. In early January 1978, Dickinson was invited by Devoto to play for a few gigs but he declined the offer due to his ongoing postgrad electronic music research at Keele University. The music for the album's final track, "Parade", was written by Dickinson's replacement, Dave Formula, with bassist Barry Adamson. "Definitive Gaze" was recorded for a Peel session as "Real Life" on 14 February 1978.

Having toured much of the album through 1977 and early 1978, the group's then lineup of Devoto (vocals), McGeoch (guitar and saxophone), Adamson (bass), Formula (keyboards) and Martin Jackson (drums) recorded the album in sessions using the Virgin Mobile and at Abbey Road Studios between March and April 1978. The album was produced and engineered by John Leckie.

The original artwork and monoprint for the album were designed by Linder, with photography by Adrian Boot.

Release 
Real Life was released on LP and cassette in June 1978. It peaked at no. 29 on the UK Albums Chart. "Shot by Both Sides", the album's only single, peaked at no. 41 on the UK Singles Chart.

The album was reissued in remastered form by Virgin/EMI in 2007, along with the other three of the band's first four studio albums, and included four bonus tracks and liner notes by Kieron Tyler.

Reception 

Real Life has been critically acclaimed since its release.

On its release, Jon Savage said in Sounds: "A commercial, quality rock album then, with deceptive depths. All is not revealed."

The album was ranked at no. 20 among the top "Albums of the Year" for 1978 by NME, with "Shot by Both Sides" ranked at no. 9 among the year's top tracks.

Legacy 
Real Life is included on several "best of" lists.

 It was included in the 2005 book 1001 Albums You Must Hear Before You Die.
 It was included in The Guardian's "1,000 Albums to Hear Before You Die" list in 2007.
 Sounds ranked it no. 89 in their "100 Best Albums of All Time" list in 1986.
 In 2006, Uncut ranked it no. 37 in their "100 Greatest Debut Albums" list.

Track listing

Personnel 

Magazine
 Howard Devoto – vocals
 John McGeoch – guitar and saxophone
 Barry Adamson – bass guitar
 Dave Formula – keyboards
 Martin Jackson – drums

Personnel
 John Leckie – production, engineering
 Mick Glossop and Magazine – production on "Shot by Both Sides" (original single version) and "My Mind Ain't So Open"
 Hayden Bendall – assistant engineer (Abbey Road)
 Adrian Boot – photography
 Linder – monoprint, design

Charts

Further reading

References

External links 
 

1978 debut albums
Magazine (band) albums
Albums produced by John Leckie
Virgin Records albums
Art rock albums by English artists